Chad Tuoro is a New Zealand Rugby union player who plays for the New Zealand Sevens team.
Saint Kentigern College Old Collegian, Head of Bruce House

International career

Sevens

Chad Tuoro was selected in the New Zealand Sevens squad of 13 for the third tournament of the 2007/2008 IRB World Sevens Series in Wellington. He was the only one potential debutant amongst the group. But Nigel Hunt had passed a fitness test, it meant that Chad would miss out on the tournament. At age 26, Tuoro went on to make his international debut for the side in Hong Kong along with North Harbour winger Nafi Tuitavake. In 2008 he made a further three appearances in Adelaide and the final two tournaments in London and Edinburgh as he replaced Solomon King because of injury.

Tuoro started 2009 off in San Diego having replaced Tomasi Cama and Edwin Cocker. He continued to be a key contributor for New Zealand, appearing in Hong Kong, Adelaide, London, Edinburgh and including the 2009 Rugby World Cup, recording 2 tries against Italy and Tonga.

Career highlights

Rugby Sevens
Auckland (2005, 2006, 2007 Pub Charity Sevens)
Counties Manukau (2008, 2009 Pub Charity Sevens)
New Zealand (2008, 2009 IRB Sevens World Series)

Rugby Union
Counties Manukau (2007, 2008 Air New Zealand Cup)
Bay of Plenty (2010 ITM Cup)

References

External links 
 

New Zealand rugby union players
1981 births
Living people
People educated at Saint Kentigern College
New Zealand international rugby sevens players